Mahmudabad-e Pazoki (also Romanized as Maḩmūdābād-e Pazoki; also known as Maḩmūdābād and Maḩmūdābād-e Pāzūkī) is a village in Filestan Rural District, in the Central District of Pakdasht County, Tehran Province, Iran. At the 2006 census, its population was 1,185, in 285 families.

References 

Populated places in Pakdasht County